This is a list of the complete squads for the 2012 Six Nations Championship, an annual rugby union tournament contested by the national rugby teams of England, France, Ireland, Italy, Scotland and Wales. Each country is entitled to name a squad of 39 players to contest the championship. They may also invite additional players along prior to the start of the championship, while the coach can call up replacement players if squad members suffer serious injury.

NB
 Ages are given as of 4 February 2012, the opening day of the tournament.
 All cap totals are as of the start of the tournament, and do not include appearances made during the competition.

England
Interim England manager Stuart Lancaster announced a 32-man England squad for the 2012 Six Nations on 11 January. Although lock Louis Deacon was named to the squad, he was ruled out of the tournament with a hamstring injury.

Team Manager:  Stuart Lancaster

France
Philippe Saint-André announced a 30-man France squad for the 2011 Six Nations on 5 January. Two days later, Romain Millo-Chluski dislocated his right shoulder in a Top 14 match, potentially ruling him out for the entire Six Nations; Lionel Nallet was named as his replacement. The prop David Attoub is called up in the list for the game against Italy

Head coach:  Philippe Saint-André

Ireland
Ireland named an initial 24-man squad for the 2012 Six Nations on 18 January. A full squad was announced on 30 January, after the country's A national team, Ireland Wolfhounds, played England Saxons.

Head coach:  Declan Kidney

Italy
Jacques Brunel announced his 30-man squad for the 2012 Six Nations on 16 January. The squad will be cut to 24 before going to Paris for the opener against France.

Head coach:  Jacques Brunel

Scotland
Andy Robinson announced Scotland's 36-man squad for the Six Nations on 5 January. Steven Shingler, initially chosen for the squad, was confirmed to be ineligible for Scotland by the International Rugby Board due to his caps for Wales U20. Moray Low was ruled out for 2 months, his place in the squad was taken by clubmate Ed Kalman.

On 24 January, Ross Ford was named captain for the Six Nations.

Head coach:  Andy Robinson

Wales
Warren Gatland named a 35-man squad for the 2012 Six Nations on 18 January.

Head coach:  Warren Gatland

References

External links
 RBS Six Nations Squad Index

2012
2012 Six Nations Championship